Below are statistics and records related to FC Seoul.

Honours

Domestic competitions

League
 K League 1
Winners (6): 1985, 1990, 2000, 2010, 2012, 2016
Runners-up (5): 1986, 1989, 1993, 2001, 2008

Cups
 FA Cup
Winners (2): 1998, 2015
Runners-up (3): 2014, 2016, 2022
 League Cup
Winners (2): 2006, 2010
Runners-up (4): 1992, 1994, 1999, 2007
 Super Cup
Winners (1): 2001
Runners-up (1): 1999
 National Football Championship
Winners (1): 1988

International competitions

Asian
 AFC Champions League
Runners-up (2): 2001–02, 2013

Friendly competitions
 Saitama City Cup	
Winners (1): 2017

Doubles
 Domestic double
 K League and League Cup Champions (1): 2010

Team

Season-by-season records
※ K League: Only regular season results are counted. Postseason (League Championship and Promotion-relegation PO) results are not included.
※ 1993, 1998, 1999, 2000 seasons had penalty shoot-outs instead of draws.
※ A: Adidas Cup, P: Prospecs Cup, PM: Philip Morris Cup, D: Daehan Fire Insurance Cup

K League Championship records

K League promotion-relegation playoffs

All-Time Competitions Records
※ As of 31 December 2016
※ Walkover results are counted.
※ Penalty shoot-outs results are counted as a drawn match.

All-Time K League 1 Results by Opponents
※ As of 1984–2013 seasons

All-Time K League 1 Records 
※ 1984-2012 seasons
※ Penalty shoot-outs results are not counted as a drawn match

Firsts

Mosts in Goals

Most Consecutive Records 
※ 1984-2013 seasons

Historic Victory 
※ Only matches in K League 1 and League Cup are counted.

Historic Goal 
※ Only matches in K League 1 and League Cup are counted.

Players 
※ Statistics correct as of last match played in 2015 season.
※ Bold denotes players still playing in the K League
※ Appearance, Goals, Clean Sheets, Goals conceded per Match records included FA Cup and Asian Club Competitions, Other competitive competitions.
※ Other competitive competitions are as below: 
 K League unofficial matches: 1986 K League Championship - 2 matches, 1992 League Cup Final - 2 matches
 1999 Korean Super Cup - 1 match, 2001 Korean Super Cup - 1 match 
 1988 Korean National Football Championship - 4 matches, 1989 Korean National Football Championship - 3 matches
 2018 K League promotion-relegation playoffs - 2 matches
※ Assists and Attack Points records only includes K League 1 and Korean League Cup.
※ Attack Points are the aggregate number of goals  assists in K League 1 and Korean League Cup.

Appearances 
※ FC Seoul players with at least 200 appearances. 
※ As of May 3, 2019

Goals

Assists

Attack Points

Clean Sheets

Goals conceded per Match 
※ FC Seoul goalkeepers with at least 50 appearances.

Mosts in a Single Match

Mosts in a Single Season

Most Goals in a Single Season by Competitions

Most Clean Sheets in a Single Season by Competitions

Most Consecutive Records

Managers

Managerial History 
※ For details on all-time manager statistics, see List of FC Seoul coaching staffs.

Match Results

※ Win%, Draw%, Lose%, GFA, GAA: Only K League regular season (included K League Championship) and League Cup matches are counted.
※ Penalty shoot-outs results in 1993, 1998, 1999, 2000 seasons are not counted by K League's principle of official statistics.

Debut Match

Player Debut Match

Manager Debut Match

Members

Founding Members 

※ After Inauguration ceremony (1983-12-22), These players are joined.

Captains

Players in Major Competitions 
 For details on all-time players, see List of FC Seoul players in major competitions.
※ Seo Jung-Won and Choi Yong-Soo were on military service during World Cup.
※ As of 2010 World Cup South Korea, 20 players from FC Seoul participate in World Cup.

Chairmans

Attendance

Total Attendance & Average Attendance
※ Season total attendance is K League 1 Regular season, K League Postseason (2004–2011: Championship, 2013–present: Promotion-relegation PO), League Cup, FA Cup, AFC Champions Leaguein the aggregate and friendly match attendance is not included.
※ K League season total attendance is K League 1 Regular season, K League Postseason (2004–2011: Championship, 2013–present: Promotion-relegation PO), League Cup in the aggregate.

Attendance New Records by FC Seoul

Korean Professional Sports Single-Match Highest Attendance Records Top 10

Transfers fee
 For details transfers fee, see List of FC Seoul transfers.

Highest Transfer Fees Received Top 10
※ Rangk is based on South Korean won converted at the exchange rate, at that time.

Highest Transfer Fees Paid Top 10 
※ Rangking is based on South Korean won converted at the exchange rate, at that time.

Others

Sister clubs

See also
 FC Seoul award winners
 FC Seoul in Asia

References

External links
 FC Seoul Official Website 
 Statistics at K League Official Website 
 FC Seoul matchday Magazine 
 Naver Digital News Archive 
 Monthly Football Magazine - Best Eleven 
 The Daily Sports Newspaper Microfilm at the National Library of Korea 

FC Seoul
South Korean football club records and statistics